Lago di Salarno is a lake in the Province of Brescia, Lombardy, Italy.

Lakes of Lombardy